is a Japanese professional futsal club, currently playing in the F. League Division 1. The team is located in Osaka, Japan. Their main arena is Osaka Municipal Central Gymnasium, but they also play at the Kishiwada General Gymnasium and at the Sumiyoshi Sports Center.

The team's name is a portmanteau of "shrike", the Osaka prefectural bird, and "striker".

History

Trophies and records
F. League:
Winners: 2016-17
All Japan Futsal Championship:
Winners: 2010, 2012, 2017
F.League Ocean Cup:
Winners: 2008, 2009
Runners up: 2010, 2011

F League

Mascot
The official team mascot is Shrappy (シュラッピー), a shrike, in line with the team's name. Its name was decided through fan submissions of potential mascot names.

References

External links
  

Futsal clubs in Japan
Futsal clubs established in 2002
2002 establishments in Japan